Mother Lode is the fourth studio album (fifth release overall) by singer-songwriter duo Loggins and Messina, released in late 1974. It was their final album with their original backing band, because multireedist and violinist Al Garth would soon leave the band, but multireedist Jon Clarke, bassist Larry Sims and drummer Merel Bregante remained, and saxophonist Don Roberts made his debut on this record. Future Toto keyboardist David Paich plays keyboards on this album while percussionist Milt Holland is augmented by Victor Feldman and the album was recorded on location at Jim Messina's California ranch. The Jim Messina composition "Keep Me in Mind" was sung by bassist Sims, whom Messina praised for having a phenomenal voice in a 2009 interview with Loggins for KCTS-TV.

Track listing

Side one
"Growin'" (Kenny Loggins, Ronnie Wilkins) – 2:39 (lead singer: Kenny Loggins)
"Be Free" (Jim Messina) – 7:01 (lead singer: Jim Messina)
"Changes" (Messina) – 3:53 (lead singer: Jim Messina)
"Brighter Days" (Loggins, Dona Lyn George) – 3:42 (lead singer: Kenny Loggins)
"Time to Space" (Loggins, George) – 5:48 (lead singers: Kenny Loggins, Larry Sims)

Side two
"Lately My Love" (Messina) – 3:32 (lead singer: Jim Messina)
"Move On" (Messina) – 7:29 (lead singer: Jim Messina)
"Get a Hold" (Loggins) – 3:37 (lead singer: Kenny Loggins)
"Keep Me in Mind" (Messina) – 3:38 (lead singer: Larry Sims)
"Fever Dream" (Loggins, Maury Muehleisen) – 3:03 (lead singer: Kenny Loggins)

Personnel
 Kenny Loggins – vocals, rhythm guitar, acoustic guitar, harmonica
 Jim Messina – vocals, lead guitar, acoustic guitar, mandolin

Loggins and Messina band
 Larry Sims – bass, backing vocals, lead vocals on "Keep Me in Mind"
 Merel Bregante – drums, timbales, backing vocals
 Jon Clarke – flute, oboe, bass flute, English horn, tenor saxophone, alto flute, soprano saxophone, baritone saxophone, bass saxophone
 Al Garth – violin, recorder, tenor saxophone, alto saxophone, bass clarinet

Sidemen
 Chris Brooks – koto
 Milt Holland – percussion
 Victor Feldman – percussion
 David Paich – keyboards
 Don Roberts – flute, bass flute, tenor saxophone, soprano saxophone, baritone saxophone, bass saxophone, bass clarinet, alto flute
 David Wallace – synthesizers

Production
 Producer – Jim Messina
 Engineers – Corey Bailey, Alex Kazanegras and Jim Messina.
 Technical Assistance – Lou Shatzer
 Recorded on location at Jim Messina's Ranch, Ojai, California using Haji Sound.
 Photography – Tyler Thornton
 Color Prints – Ted Staidle
 Art Direction and Design – Ron Coro
 Personal Management – Schiffman and Larsen
 Road Management – David Cieslak and Jim Recor

Charts
Album – Billboard (United States)

Singles - Billboard (United States)

References

Loggins and Messina albums
1974 albums
Albums produced by Jim Messina (musician)
Columbia Records albums
Albums recorded in a home studio